Fort Worth, Texas is a U.S. city that is also the fifth-most populous municipality in the state of Texas.

Fort Worth may also refer to:

Fort Worth, Virginia, an American Civil War fortification
Fort Worth (film), a 1951 American western
USS Fort Worth, a littoral combat ship of the United States Navy